Rasma Garne (born 26 March 1941) is a Latvian stage and film actress. She has performed roles in film including Mēs esam četri (1972), Ja nebūtu šī skuķa (1980), Lietus blūzs (1982), Zītaru dzimta (1989), and Depresija (1991).

Garne was awarded the Order of the Three Stars on 17 November 2018.

References

 Latvian stage actresses
 Latvian film actresses
1941 births
Living people